The Sax Altman Tournament was a golf tournament held in New Zealand in late November 1968. The event was played on the Lochiel course near Hamilton, New Zealand. It was the first event of the New Zealand's summer golf circuit. The event resulted in a tie between Peter Thomson and Guy Wolstenholme. Kel Nagle finished a stroke behind. Wolstenholme missed a 14-foot putt on the final green that would have given him an outright victory.

Winners

References

Golf tournaments in New Zealand